The Illinois State Redbirds men's basketball team represents Illinois State University, located in Normal, Illinois, in NCAA Division I basketball competition. They are currently led by head coach Ryan Pedon and play their home games at CEFCU Arena as a member of the Missouri Valley Conference.  They have the distinction of earning the most National Invitation Tournament berths (14) without making the semifinals, and also have the longest current NCAA tournament drought (22 seasons) among Missouri Valley Conference members.

Season-by-season records

NCAA Division I

Source

Postseason

NCAA tournament results
The Redbirds have appeared in six NCAA Tournaments. Their combined record is 3–6.

Source

NIT results
The Redbirds have appeared in 14 National Invitation Tournaments (NIT). Their combined record is 11–14.

Source

CBI results
The Redbirds have appeared in one College Basketball Invitational (CBI). Their record is 2–1. They turned down a bid in the 2015–16 season and again in the 2017–18 season.

Source

Players

Retired numbers

Illinois State has retired only one number in program history, that of first-team All-American and Olympian Doug Collins.

Redbirds drafted into the NBA

Redbirds in international leagues

Jackie Carmichael (born 1990)

Rivalries
The I-74 Rivalry is the rivalry between Illinois State and Bradley.

Plane crash
On April 7, 2015, while flying home from the NCAA Tournament Final game in Indianapolis, a plane carrying Illinois State assistant coach Torrey Ward and six others crashed just outside Bloomington, Illinois, leaving no survivors.

References

External links